Nókis district or Nukus district (Karakalpak: Нөкис районы, Nókis rayonı) is a district in the Republic of Karakalpakstan. Population 41,890 (1989). The capital lies at the town Aqmańģıt. The city of Nukus is not part of the district.

There are one town Aqmańģıt and six rural communities Arbashi, Baqanshaqli, Kerder, Samanbay, Taqirkól, Krantau.

Largely an agricultural district, the Karakalpaktomat enterprise, active in the area  uses drip irrigation methods in cotton growing. Due to this, the crop capacity reaches 70 centners per hectare, which is among the country's highest figures.

References

Karakalpakstan
Districts of Uzbekistan